is a railway station operated by JR West on the Gantoku Line in Kudamatsu, Yamaguchi.

History

March 27, 1987: Station opens
April 1, 1987: Station operation is taken over by JR West after privatization of Japanese National Railways

Layout
The station has one track, with one side platform serving both directions of travel.

Adjacent stations
West Japan Railway (JR West)

External links
  
 Kudamatsu City website 

Railway stations in Japan opened in 1987
Railway stations in Yamaguchi Prefecture